Nimioglossa is a genus of tachinid flies in the family Tachinidae.

Species
N. planicosta Reinhard, 1945
N. ravida Reinhard, 1945

References

Dexiinae
Diptera of North America
Tachinidae genera